The 2021–22 KHL season was the 14th season of the Kontinental Hockey League. There were 24 teams that competed in 56 regular season games, beginning on 1 September 2021 and was scheduled to finish on 1 March 2022. However, the COVID-19 pandemic in Russia resulted in more than 50 games being postponed prior to the break for the 2022 Winter Olympics, and in February, it was announced that no further regular season games would be played following the break. In the finals, CSKA beat Metallurg in seven games.

Season changes
For the 2021–22 season, the competition returned to 24 teams after Admiral Vladivostok returned from a season's hiatus due to the COVID-19 pandemic in Russia affecting their financial status.

There was an additional break during the season due to the 2022 Winter Olympics, held in February in Beijing, China.

Teams
The 24 teams were split into four divisions: the Bobrov Division and the Tarasov Division as part of the Western Conference, with the Kharlamov Division and the Chernyshev Division as part of the Eastern Conference.

Following Admiral Vladivostok's return to the league, Torpedo moved back to the Western Conference and joined the Bobrov Division, with Severstal moving into the Tarasov. Admiral was inserted back into the Chernyshev Division, with Kunlun Red Star moving into the Kharlamov Division.

League standings
Each team was scheduled to play 56 games: playing every other team home-and-away (46 games), plus additional home-and-away games against five intra-conference teams (10 games). Points were awarded for each game, where two points were awarded for all victories, regardless of whether it was in regulation time, in overtime or after game-winning shots. One point was awarded for losing in overtime or game-winning shots, and zero points for losing in regulation time. In the 2021–22 season, the second seed in each conference would not be guaranteed to a divisional winner.

With the discontinuation of the regular season, it was proposed that teams were to be ranked by points percentage, with the top eight from each conference scheduled to qualify for the Gagarin Cup playoffs. This was subject to approval by the KHL Board of Directors and the Ice Hockey Federation of Russia. This was confirmed on 16 February.

Western Conference

Eastern Conference

Gagarin Cup playoffs

Following the curtailment of the regular season, the playoffs were brought forward to start from 1 March.

On 25 February 2022, Jokerit announced their withdrawal from the league for the remainder of the season, including the playoffs, due to the Russian invasion of Ukraine. Their first round opponents Spartak Moscow were given four forfeit victories and progressed to the second round of the playoffs.  Dinamo Riga subsequently also withdrew from the league for the same reason.

Statistics

Scoring leaders

The following players led the league in points, at the conclusion of the regular season. If two or more skaters are tied (i.e. same number of points, goals and played games), all of the tied skaters are shown.

Leading goaltenders
The following goaltenders led the league in goals against average, at the conclusion of the regular season.

References

External links
 

Kontinental Hockey League seasons
KHL
2021–22 in Russian ice hockey